Nikolskoye is a rural locality (a selo) and the administrative center of Nikolskoye Rural Settlement, Kaduysky District, Vologda Oblast, Russia. The population was 397 as of 2002. There are 15 streets.

Geography 
Nikolskoye is located 25 km north of Kaduy (the district's administrative centre) by road. Novoye is the nearest rural locality.

References 

Rural localities in Kaduysky District